The Radio One Sessions is a compilation of BBC Radio One sessions recorded by Britpop group Elastica. The album is notable for the appearance of several songs not included on any other Elastica release.

Track listing
 "Annie" (Donna Matthews) – 1:15
 "Spastica" (Justine Frischmann) – 2:34
 "Line Up" (Frischmann) – 3:12
 "Vaseline" (Frischmann) – 1:20
 "Brighton Rock" (Frischmann, Elastica) – 1:56
 "In The City" (Frischmann) – 1:31
 "Waking Up" (Burnell, Cornwell, Duffy, Frischmann, Greenfield) – 3:17
 "Four Wheeling" (Car Song) (Frischmann) – 2:26
 "Hold Me Now" (Matthews) – 2:26
 "Ba Ba Ba" (Frischmann) – 2:33
 "All For Gloria" (Traditional) – 3:02
 "I Wanna Be a King of Orient Aah" (Traditional) – 2:05
 "Rockunroll" (Frischmann) – 2:14
 "2:1" (Matthews) – 2:29
 "I Want You" (Frischmann) – 4:05
 "Only Human" (Gilbert, Robert Gotobed, Lewis, Matthews, Newman) – 3:24
 "A Love Like Ours" (Matthews) – 2:27
 "KB" (Frischmann, Nagle, Smith) – 3:13
 "Da Da Da" (Kralle Krawinkel, Stephan Remmler) – 3:41
 "Generator" (Frischmann) – 1:47
 "Your Arse My Place" (Frischmann) – 1:46

The releases omits 10 tracks recorded by the band for BBC Radio 1, in many cases because they were already present from another session.
 "Rockunroll" (1993.09.18) Peel Session *previously released as a b-side to Line Up
 "2:1" (1994.03.16) Evening Session *previously released as a b-side to Stutter
 "Connection" (1994.03.16) Evening Session *previously released on Evening Session Priority Tunes compilation album.
 "Never Here" (1994.06.14) Peel Session
 "Father Christmas" (1994.12.06) Peel Session (unreleased song)
 "Blue" (1994.12.06) Peel Session 
 "Gloria" (1995.03.28) Radcliffe Session
 "Car Song" (1995.03.28) Radcliffe Session
 "The Other Side" (1996.07.10) Evening Session (unreleased song)
 "Mad Dog" (1999.09.22) Peel Session

Recording details
Tracks 1-5 recorded for John Peel, 18 September 1993
Tracks 6-7 recorded for the Evening Session, 16 March 1994
Tracks 8-10 recorded for John Peel, 14 June 1994
Tracks 11-12 recorded for John Peel, 6 December 1994
Tracks 13-14 recorded for Mark Radcliffe, 28 March 1995
Tracks 15-17 recorded for the Evening Session, 10 July 1996
Tracks 18-21 recorded for John Peel, 22 September 1999

Personnel
Miti Adhikari – producer
James Birtwistle – producer
Dave Bush – keyboards, programming
Sheila Chipperfield – bass
Tim Durham – producer
Nick Fountain – engineer
Justine Frischmann – guitar, vocals
Nick Gomm – producer
Steve Gullick – photography, inlay photography
Annie Holland – bass
Paul Jones – guitar
Fred Kay – engineer
Steve Lamacq – liner notes
Donna Matthews – guitar, backing vocals
Mew – keyboards, backing vocals
Lis Roberts – producer
Andy Rogers – engineer
Lisa Softley – engineer
George W. Thomas – engineer
Justin Welch – drums, voices
Tony Worthington – engineer

References

Elastica albums
BBC Radio recordings
2001 live albums
2001 compilation albums
E1 Music compilation albums
E1 Music live albums